Henri Kontinen and John Peers were the defending champions but lost in the first round to Kyle Edmund and Neal Skupski.

Marcus Daniell and Wesley Koolhof won the title, defeating Rajeev Ram and Joe Salisbury in the final, 6–4, 7–6(8–6).

Seeds

Draw

Draw

References
Main Draw

Brisbane International - Doubles
2019 Brisbane International